Going Nowhere Fat is a compilation album released August 7, 2015 by Fat Wreck Chords as the eighth volume in the label's Fat Music series. When it was released, six of the tracks were previously unreleased. Three of them, the tracks by PEARS, Leftöver Crack and Night Birds, were later released on an album or single, leaving three, the tracks by NOFX, Swingin' Utters and Western Addiction, unavailable anywhere else.

Track listing

External links 
Going Nowhere Fat at Fat Wreck Chords

2010 albums
Punk rock compilation albums